Tim Remole (born October 2, 1957) is an American Republican politician. He is a member of the Missouri House of Representatives from the 6th District, being first elected in 2012.

References

External links
Official website

1957 births
Living people
People from Danville, Illinois
Republican Party members of the Missouri House of Representatives
21st-century American politicians